Intellinet is a management consulting and Microsoft-centric technology services firm.

History 
 1993  Founded in Atlanta, GA by J. Frank Bell
 1998  Intellinet Launches Georgia CIO of the Year Awards
 2003  Acquired Information Technology Enterprises (ITE) and expanded into North Carolina and South Carolina
 2003  Intellinet forms Georgia CIO Leadership Association
 2008  Frank Bell Assumes Role as Intellinet Chairman and Announces Hardin Byars to Serve as CEO
 2010  Mark Seeley named as President and Senior Partner
 2011  Opened office in Durham, NC
2013  Intellinet was awarded by Consulting Magazine as "Best Small Firms to Work For".

Awards and industry recognition 
 Consulting Magazine's Best Small Firms to Work For
 Inc. 5000
Fortune.com and Great Rated! 20 Great Workplaces in Tech
Atlanta Journal-Constitution Top Workplace
Charlotte Business Journal's Best Places to Work
Microsoft Worldwide Business Intelligence Solution of the Year
 SQL Server Innovator Award Finalist
 Inc. 500
 Microsoft Knowledge Management Solution of the Year
 Microsoft Partner of the Year, Worldwide Finalist

Services 
According to its website, Intellinet’s services focus on:

Management Consulting
 Strategy Services
 Process Services
 Business Alignment
 Business Operations

Technology Consulting 
 Business Intelligence
 Portals and Collaboration
 Data Management
 Custom Development
 Application Integration
 Infrastructure

References

External links 
 

Management consulting firms of the United States
Information technology consulting firms of the United States